Bela seyithasanensis is an extinct species of sea snail, a marine gastropod mollusk in the family Mangeliidae.

Description

Distribution
This extinct marine species was found in Miocene strata in Turkey.

References

External links

seyithasanensis